David Hardy Lemieux (born November 8, 1970) is an audio and film archivist.  He is a Grammy, Juno, and Gemini Award voting member.  He is the audiovisual archivist and legacy manager for the Grateful Dead.

Education
Lemieux is originally from Ottawa, Ontario, Canada, and was educated at Carleton University in Ottawa (BA in history), Concordia University in Montreal (BFA in film studies) and the University of East Anglia in Norwich, UK (MA in film archiving).

Grateful Dead
He has been working as the Grateful Dead's audiovisual archivist and CD/DVD producer since September 1999. He was put in charge of the Grateful Dead's vault after the August 1999 passing of original Grateful Dead tape archivist Dick Latvala. With his producing partner, and long-time Grateful Dead studio engineer, Jeffrey Norman, Lemieux has produced scores of Grateful Dead CD and DVD releases since 2000. The Dave's Picks series is titled after Lemieux.  He has also produced several CD releases by Jerry Garcia.

Lemieux hosts a daily radio show on The Grateful Dead Channel on SiriusXM Satellite Radio (Channel 23)/Dish Network (Channel 6023), Today in Grateful Dead History, in which he selects a segment of music from that day in the Grateful Dead's history and explains its historical context and other information relating to the selection.

Other
Lemieux is also the editor of the Association of Moving Image Archivists' quarterly Newsletter.
He is on the board of directors of the Victoria Film Festival in Victoria, British Columbia, Canada, where he has been on the programming committee since 2003, and for which he writes film notes for the festival's official programme guide.

References

Selvin, Joel. "Every Single Note of Dead's Famous 4-night Run is Finally Out in a CD Set; Good Luck Finding It", San Francisco Chronicle, November 8, 2005
Schiesel, Seth. "Jerry Garcia: The Man, the Myth, the Area Rug", The New York Times, August 9, 2005
Times People photo of David Lemieux, The New York Times, August 9, 2005
Jurgensen, John. "Grateful Dead Profits are Far from Moribund", Los Angeles Times, August 27, 2000
Gatta, John Patrick. "Truckin' Up To Buffalo (Part One of an Interview with Grateful Dead Archivist David Lemieux) , Jambands.com, July 9, 2005
Gatta, John Patrick. "The Houseboat Tapes, the Fillmore Box and Listening Forward (Part Two of an Interview with Grateful Dead Archivist David Lemieux)", Jambands.com, August 9, 2005
Levy, Eric. "Interview from the Vault: A Conversation with David Lemieux (Part 1)", The Music Box, February 2002
Levy, Eric. "Interview from the Vault: A Conversation with David Lemieux (Part 2)", The Music Box, March 2002
Levy, Eric. "Interview from the Vault: A Conversation with David Lemieux (Part 3)", The Music Box, May 2002
Elkin, Sam. "Opening the Dead's Vault: David Lemieux", JamBase, December 16, 2004
"Ground Zero: Inside the Grateful Dead Vault", Relix, April 2001
Bowman, Samantha. "Sirius' Grateful Dead Channel to Celebrate its One Year Anniversary", Reuters, September 2, 2008

American archivists
Canadian audio engineers
Grateful Dead
Living people
Alumni of the University of East Anglia
Carleton University alumni
Concordia University alumni
American audio engineers
1970 births